The All-Ireland Colleges Camogie Championships are a range of Irish camogie tournaments played each year to determine the national champion secondary school or second level college at senior and junior level over a range of grades.

Since 1969 these competitions have been administered by the Secondary Education committee of the Camogie Association. The record holders in the Senior 'A' competition are St. Raphael's College, Loughrea, Co Galway with 8 senior titles in a row.  They have been joined at the top of the roll of honour by Loreto Secondary School, Kilkenny who also have eight titles. The current holders of the cup are Loreto Secondary School Kilkenny having defeated St. Patrick's Maghara in the 2023 final.

Graded Competitions
There are graded competitions for colleges at three different levels. In the 2011 All-Ireland Senior B final Grennan College, Thomastown (4-10) defeated St Louis, Ballymena (3-3) in Trim. In the 2011 All-Ireland Senior C final Castlecomer Community School (Kilkenny) (4-2) defeated St Pius X College Magherafelt (2-5) in Trim, Co Meath.

Trophy
The trophy for the Senior 'A' competition is the Corn Sceilge in honour of Seán Ó Ceallaigh (1872-1959) (known as Sceilg, an acronym of his name in ), one of the members of the Keating Branch of the Gaelic League that participated in the first Camogie matches in 1904.

Participation Levels
There are 300 secondary schools participating in camogie competitions throughout Ireland and the Women in Sport projects run since 2004 have helped increase the number of secondary schools playing camogie.
Competitions are run on a provincial basis with provincial winners progressing to All-Ireland semi-finals and finals at both junior (1st - 3rd year) and senior (4th - 6th year) level.

Schools Camogie Highlights
Prior to the establishment of an All-Ireland competition in 1969, colleges competitions had been organized in Cork in 1914 and Dublin in 1919. Dublin and Cork colleges played an annual inter-city fixture. Dublin schools teams also participated in the Dublin league against club sides.

In the inaugural competition in 1969, Presentation Secondary School, Kilkenny defeated St Michael's, Lurgan by 5-0 to 2-2 in the first All-Ireland semi-final and in the final defeated St Aloysius, Cork, who had defeated St. Mary's, Tuam in the other semi-final. 
All-Ireland finals were held at Croke Park until 1981. The first midweek final took place in 1998 at The Ragg in Thurles, the first sportsfield to be designated exclusively for camogie fixtures.
Eileen O’Brien from St Mary's, Charleville won nine All-Ireland colleges medals, one junior, four senior and four seven-a-side colleges medals. She scored 0-11 in the 1995 final when she was 14.

Interprovincial
A colleges inter-provincial series has been played annually since 1979. The inaugural competition was won by Munster, defeating Connacht by 5-5 to 3-3 in the final with the help of a winning goal by Majella Hallinan.

Senior 'A' Roll of Honour

All-Ireland Senior 'A' Colleges Camogie Finals
The first figure is the number of goals scored (equal to 3 points each) and the second total is the number of points scored, the figures are combined to determine the winner of a match in Gaelic Games

All-Ireland Senior B Colleges Camogie Finals

All-Ireland Senior C Colleges Camogie Finals

All-Ireland Senior D Colleges Camogie Finals

All-Ireland Junior Colleges 'A' Camogie Finals

All-Ireland Junior B Colleges Camogie Finals

All-Ireland Junior C Colleges Camogie Finals

All-Ireland Junior D Colleges Camogie Finals

References

External links
Official Camogie Website

 
Colleges